Horna (formerly known as Shadowed) is a Finnish black metal band that formed in 1993. The band has appeared on over thirty releases including splits, demos, EPs and albums since 1995, which have been released through numerous record labels. The name "Horna" is Finnish for "abyss" or "hell". It was chosen because, to Shatraug, it sounded harsh and powerful.

History 
Horna was formed in late 1993 under the name Shadowed, by vocalist and guitarist Shatraug and guitarist Moredhel. The name was changed to Horna when drummer Gorthaur joined the band in 1994. Horna did not start recording until early 1995. The first demo, Varjoissa, was released in September that year and sold out. In 1996, Nazgul von Armageddon took over vocal duties and the band recorded their first full-length album Hiidentorni in January 1997, resulting in a deal with the Greek label Solistitium Records. The band continued to release albums under this label through June 1998, when Moredhel and bassist Skratt left the band. Bassist Thanatos replaced Skratt soon afterwards, and Moredhel re-joined that August. In 1999, the band signed to Norwegian label Oskorei Productions for a vinyl-only release of the band's third album, Haudankylmyyden Mailla, and the band released a series of limited vinyl-only EPs and split albums through most of the early 2000s, with full-length studio albums coming out in the latter half of the decade. In 2002, Nazgul von Armageddon left the band, leaving vocal duties to Corvus. In July 2003, it was announced that guitarist Aarni T. Otava had left the group. Horna cited the loss of "dedication" as the reason behind his departure, and revealed that Horna's performance at 2003's Tuska Open Air Metal Festival would be their last with Otava handling guitar duties. In 2008 Horna embarked on an American tour. They played their first American show on Halloween 2008 at "The Black Castle" courtesy of underground promoter Chris "Hate War" Wood. Horna has been criticized for NSBM ties.

Members

Current members 
 Shatraug (Ville Pystynen) – guitar (1993–present), vocals (1993–1996), backing vocals (1996–present)
 Infection (Mynni Luukkainen) – bass guitar (2002–2008), guitar, backing vocals (2008–present)
 Spellgoth (Tuomas "SG.7" Rytkönen) – lead vocals (2009–present)
 LRH (Lauri "Kassara" Rytkönen) – drums (2016–present)
 VnoM (Ville Markkanen) – bass guitar (2018–present)

Former members 
 Moredhel (Jyri Vahvanen) – guitars (1993–1998), bass (1999–2000)
 Gorthaur (Jarkko Heilimo) – drums (1994–2003, 2005)
 Nazgul von Armageddon (Lauri "Werwolf" Penttilä) – lead vocals (1996–2001), keyboards (1999)
 Skratt (Pasi Teitto) – bass (1997–1998), keyboards (1997–1998)
 A.T. Otava (Harri "Thanatos" Ollikainen) – bass (1998), guitars (1999–2000, 2000–2003)
 Vrasjarn (Anssi Mäkinen) – bass (2000–2001)
 Corvus (Tapsa Kuusela) – lead vocals (2002–2009)
 Saturnus (Alex Schorn) – guitars (2003–2007)
 Vainaja (Perttu Pakkanen) – drums (2007–2016)
 Lord Sargofagian (Ossi Mäkinen) – drums (2007)
 Hex Inferi (Mika Packalen) – bass (2012–2018)

Timeline

Discography

Studio albums 
Kohti Yhdeksän Nousua (1998), Solistitium Records
Haudankylmyyden Mailla (1999), Solistitium Records
Sudentaival (2001), Woodcut Records
Envaatnags Eflos Solf Esgantaavne (2005), Woodcut Records
Ääniä Yössä (2006), Moribund Records
Sotahuuto (2007), Moribund Records
Sanojesi Äärelle (2008), Debemur Morti Productions / Deviant Records
Askel lähempänä Saatanaa (2013), World Terror Committee
Hengen tulet (2015), World Terror Committee
Kuoleman kirjo (2020), World Terror Committee

EPs 
Sota (1999), Sinister Productions
Perimä Vihassa Ja Verikostossa (1999), Oskorei Productions
Korpin Hetki (2002), Apocalyptic Empire Records
Risti ja Ruoska (2002), Ledo Takas Records
Viha ja Viikate (2003), Woodcut Records
Talismaani (2004), Static Supernova
Vuohipaimen (2004), Obscure Abhorrence Records
Pimeyden Hehku (2007), Debemur Morti Productions
Herran edessä (2009), Deviant Records
Adventus Satanae (2011), World Terror Committee
Kuolleiden kuu (2018), World Terror Committee

Splits 
Whispered Myths with Fog (1999), Dark Horizon
first split with Musta Surma (2000), End All Life Productions
second split with Musta Surma (2002), Blut Und Eisen Records
split with Desolation Triumphalis (2003), D.U.K.E. Records
split with Ouroboros (2003), lookinglassblack
split with Woods of Infinity (2004), Klaxon Productions
split with Behexen (2004), Grievantee Productions
Goatfucking Gent/Vivicomburium with Kerberos (2005), Obscure Abhorrence Productions
Unohdetut Kasvot, Unohdettu Ääni/Un Sogno Oscuro with Tenebrae in Perpetuum (2005), Debemur Morti Productions
split with Blackdeath (2005), From Beyond Productions
Ilman Arvoa ja Arkkua/Kinaidos with Legion of Doom (2006), Zyklon-B Records
split with Sacrificia Mortuorum (2006), Debemur Morti/Grievantee
split with Peste Noire (2007), Debemur Morti Productions
split with Nefarious (2009), Turanian Honour Productions
split with Den Saakaldte (2014), Blut & Eisen Productions
split with Demonic Christ (2014), Hammer of Hate Records
Atavistic Resurgence with Acherontas (2015), World Terror Committee
split with Pure (2018), World Terror Committee

Compilations 
Hiidentorni / Perimä Vihassa Ja Verikostossa (2000), Woodcut Records
Ordo Regnum Sathanas (2004), Adversary Productions
Kun Synkkä Ikuisuus Avautuu (2006), Northern Sky Productions
Vihan Vuodet (2005), Grievantee Productions
Musta Kaipuu (2009), Debemur Morti Productions
Kasteessa kirottu (2018), Zero Dimensional Records

Demos 
Varjoissa (1995), self-produced
Hiidentorni (1997), Solistitium Records

Live albums 
Black Metal Warfare (2004), Deviant Records
Vihan tiellä (2009), Frostscald Records
Live Armageddon 1999–2000 (2016), Independent

References

External links 

Horna at Encyclopaedia Metallum
Horna Interview at Diabolical Conquest Webzine

Finnish black metal musical groups
Musical groups established in 1993
Musical quintets
1993 establishments in Finland
Satanism and Nazism